"Heaven Must Be Missing an Angel" is a disco song written by Freddie Perren and Keni St. Lewis. It was recorded by the American band Tavares in 1976. It was released as the first single from their fourth album, Sky High! (1976), and was split into two parts: the first part was 3 minutes and 28 seconds in length, while the second part was 3 minutes and 10 seconds. "Heaven Must Be Missing an Angel" was re-released in February 1986.

"Heaven Must Be Missing an Angel" reached number 15 on the Billboard Hot 100 chart in 1976. It peaked at number three on the Hot Soul Singles chart. "Heaven Must Be Missing an Angel", with the track "Don't Take Away the Music", spent two weeks at number one on the Hot Dance Club Play chart. It became the group's only Gold record.

The song would also afford the group an international chart hit, reaching number one in the Netherlands, and charting in Australia (30), Canada (11), the UK (4), and South Africa (16).

In 2000, Italian a cappella group Neri per Caso released an Italian language version of the song, titled Sarà (Heaven Must Be Missing an Angel).

Charts

Weekly charts

Year-end charts

See also
List of Dutch Top 40 number-one singles of 1976

References

External links
[ Song Review] at Allmusic
Song Info at Discogs

Tavares (group) songs
1976 songs
1976 singles
1986 singles
Capitol Records singles
Dutch Top 40 number-one singles
Disco songs
Soul songs
Songs written by Freddie Perren
Songs written by Keni St. Lewis